Silopi District is a district of the Şırnak Province of Turkey. The seat of the district is the town of Silopi and the population was 141,621 in 2021.

Settlements 
Silopi District contains three beldes, thirty-three villages, of which seven are unpopulated, and moreover twenty-one hamlets.

Beldes 

 Başverimli
 Çalışkan
 Görümlü

Villages 

 Aksu
 Aktepe
 Akyıldız
 Ballıkaya
 Başak
 Birlikköy
 Bostancı
 Buğdaylı
 Çardaklı
 Çiftlikköy
 Damlaca
 Dedeler
 Derebaşı
 Doruklu
 Düzalan
 Esenli
 Kapılı
 Karacaköy
 Kavaközü
 Kavallı
 Koyunören
 Kösreli
 Mahmutlu
 Ortaköy
 Ovaköy
 Özgen
 Pınarönü
 Selçik
 Uyanık
 Üçağaç
 Yazıköy
 Yeniköy
 Yolağzı

References 

Districts of Şırnak Province
States and territories established in 1990